Big Brother Brasil 18 is the eighteenth season of Big Brother Brasil which premiered on January 22, 2018, on the Rede Globo. The show is produced by Endemol Globo and presented by Tiago Leifert.

The grand prize is R$1.5 million with tax allowances, plus a R$150,000 prize offered to the runner-up and a R$50,000 prize offered to the housemate in 3rd place.

On April 19, 2018, psychology student Gleici Damasceno won the competition with 57.28% of the public vote, over waiter Kaysar Dadour and journalism student Ana Clara Lima & systems analyst Ayrton Lima.

For the first time, the  BBB  had three winning women in a row.

Housemates
The cast list with sixteen Housemates was unveiled on January 18, 2018.

In addition to the 16 regular Housemates, a 17th Housemate would compete that would be composed of two members of the same family. Initially, four members of the family entered the house with Brazil voting which two would continue in the game – this eviction was held on Day 7.

Future Appearances

In 2019, Kaysar Dadour appeared in and won Dança dos Famosos 16.

In 2020, Lucas Fernandes appeared on Big Brother Brasil 20 as a model in an activity.

In 2021, Gleici Damasceno, Jéssica Müeller, Kaysar Dadour, Mahmoud Baydoun, Paula Amorim and Viegas de Carvalho appeared in No Limite 5. Mahmoud finished in 16th place, Gleici in 11th place, Kaysar in 8th place, Jéssica in 6th place, Viegas the runner-up, while Paula she won the competition.

Voting history

Legends

Notes 
 : The Lima's Family (Ana Clara, Ayrton, Eva and Jorge) entered the house on day 1 already nominated. The audience had to choose two to stay in the game. On day 7, Eva and Jorge had the fewest votes and were evicted. Ana Clara and Ayrton remained in the competition as a single housemate billed as Lima Family.
 :  On a special competition, the team formed by Caruso, Lucas, Viegas and Wagner was victorious and won two immunities and two prizes of R $5,000, to be distributed among the team. Caruso and Viegas chose R$5,000, while Lucas and Wagner chose immunity.
 : This week, the HoH (Mahmoud) had to nominate two housemates for eviction. The first nominee had to be chosen shortly after the end of the HoH competition (Ana Paula). On Sunday voting, the HoH had to make his second nomination (Mara).
 : Paula won the Power of Veto that could undo the HoH's second nomination (Mara), housemate's nomination (Jessica) or not interfere with the nominations. After announcing the nominations, Paula decided to use her Power of Veto and saved Jessica. Ana Paula and Mara went to the public vote for eviction.
 :   On the week on the HoH competition, as the first seven eliminated housemates (Kaysar, Jaqueline, Breno, Gleici, Patricia, Nayara and Paula) would have to face random consequences, placed in bottles. Upon being eliminated from the challenge, Jaqueline ended up taking the bottle with a consequence of being automatically nominated for the eviction. While Breno took the bottle that gave immunity.
 :  Like the last HoH competition, the first ten housemates that left the competition had to pick a bottle with random consequences. Wagner took the bottle that gave immunity.
 :  Lucas answered the Big Phone and he was informed he should nominate immediately a housemate to face eviction. He nominated Ana Clara & Ayrton.
 : This week, the two most nominated housemates by house faced the public vote alongside Heads of Household's vote.
 : After HoH's and house's votes, Kaysar, due to a random draw, was designated to choose a contestant to be the third nominee. He chose Lucas to join Diego and Caruso.
 :  Caruso won immunity during the Head of Household competition after picking the golden ball.
 : This week the winner of the Power of Immunity, instead of giving immunity to someone else, would win the immunity for him/herself. Viegas won the PoI, the housemates were only informed about the twist during the Nominations.
 : This week, the housemates nominated in a face-to-face round of voting, with the two highest vote receivers being nominated along with the HoH's nominee. As a result of a three-way tie between Diego, Gleici and Mahmoud (with three votes each), HoH Patricia had to break the tie and choose which two would be nominated. She nominated Gleici and Mahmoud.
 :   This week was a fake double eviction. Whilethe housemate with most votes would be evicted as usual (Mahmoud), the housemates who got fewest votes from the public would be fake evicted and move to a secret room (Gleici). Fake evictee Gleici moved to the Lighthouse and was informed she will be immune for next nomination. She will then have to nominate one contestant automatically for eviction on Friday.
 : Week 7's HoH competition was contested in pairs. The winning pair was Jessica and Paula. In addition to being Co-HoH, the duo had the right to choose between a cash prize of 10,000 reais (chosen by Jessica) and immunity (chosen by Paula)
 : Week 8's HoH competition was contested in pairs. The winning pair was Ana Clara & Ayrton (with Ana Clara participating in the competition) and Gleici. In addition to being Co-HoH, the duo had the right to choose between a cash prize of 10,000 reais (chosen by Gleici) and immunity (chosen by Ana Clara & Ayrton).
 :  Diego answered the Big Phone and he was informed he should nominate immediately a housemate to face eviction. He nominated Gleici.
 : As a result of a tie between Caruso and Jéssica (with three votes each), Co-HoHs Ana Clara & Ayrton and Gleici had to break the tie and choose one to be nominated. They nominated Jéssica.
 : Week 9's HoH competition was contested in pairs. The winning pair was Breno and Wagner. In addition to being Co-HoH, the duo had the right to choose between a cash prize of 10,000 reais (chosen by Breno) and immunity (chosen by Wagner).
 :   Week 9's Power of Immunity winner (Viegas) won immunity. Additionally, he had the power to nominate the week's third nominee. He nominated the Lima's Family (Ana Clara & Ayrton).
 : From this point forward, all nominations would be made in face-to-face voting.
 : As a result of a tie between Ana Clara & Ayrton and Viegas (with three votes each), HoH Kaysar had to break the tie and choose one to be nominated. He nominated Ana Clara & Ayrton.
 :  In week 11, the Housemates competed in a special competition for immunity and a new car. After the competition lasted almost 43 hours, Big Brother stopped the competition for the health of the Housemates. Both remaining Housemates (Ana Clara (representing herself and Ayrton) and Kaysar each winning a car. However, they had to choose among themselves who would win the immunity. The immunity winner would be ineligible for HoH and not vote during nominations. The pair chose to give immunity to Ana Clara & Ayrton.
 : During Week 11 Nominations, HoH Paula nominated Kaysar. As Ana Clara & Ayrton had immunity and were not able to vote, Breno and Gleici did not vote as they could only vote for each other and hence their votes would essentially cancel the other's out. As his vote would be the only valid vote cast, Kaysar had the power to name the second nominee between Breno and Gleici. He chose to nominate Breno.
 : Kaysar won the Final HoH, winning his place in the finale. He nominated Paula. Ana Clara & Ayrton and Gleici did not vote as they could only vote for each other and hence their votes would essentially cancel the other's out. As her vote would be the only valid vote cast, Paula had the power to name the second nominee between Ana Clara & Ayrton and Gleici. She nominated Ana Clara & Ayrton, making Gleici the second finalist. Paula and Ana Clara & Ayrton faced each other in the final eviction vote to determine the third finalist.
 : For the final, the public will vote for the housemate they want to win Big Brother Brasil 18.

References

External links
 Official site 

18
2018 Brazilian television seasons